Westwoodside is a village in North Lincolnshire, England. Westwoodside is in the civil parish of Haxey, a  town  to the east.

In earlier days, the Westwood side of the civil parish of Haxey was composed of the hamlets of Park (bef. 1882), Newbigg, Nethergate, Upperthorpe (or Overthorpe) and Commonside.

The village has a primary school.

The community is involved in an annual game over seven hundred years old called Haxey Hood.

Bradley Benjamin Thomas Anderson Musgreaves was born here in 1903. His family home has been turned into a local museum along with a conjoined post office.

References

External links

Westwoodside Primary School
Isle of Axholme website

Villages in the Borough of North Lincolnshire